Castles & Crusades (C&C) is a fantasy role-playing game published in 2004 by Troll Lord Games based upon a stripped-down variant of the d20 System by Wizards of the Coast. The game system is designed to emulate the play of earlier editions of the Dungeons & Dragons game while keeping the unified mechanics of the d20 System.

History

The game's name comes from the Castle & Crusade Society, founded in the pre-Dungeons & Dragons era by Gary Gygax. The title is in homage to the role-playing industry's birth.

The game was first released in 2004 in a boxed edition containing three digest-sized booklets, dice, and a crayon. It featured artwork by artist Peter Bradley of a knight on horseback. The reason for the box set was to have something on hand for sale at Gen Con in August 2004 as the finished Players Handbook was still four months away. A boxed set was chosen for its resemblance to the earliest versions of Dungeons & Dragons, which could be found, depending upon printing, in either a woodgrain box or a white one. As a promotion through the company's website, the first 300 copies were signed and numbered by the designers.

In December 2004, the first printing of the Players Handbook was released. Since that time, the Players Handbook has seen additional reprints. The companion volume, Monsters & Treasure, was released in 2005. The Castle Keeper's Guide was published in 2010.

System
Castles & Crusadess game mechanics are based on the d20 system, designed by Wizards of the Coast. The system has been modified to create a simplified version of the game. The alignment system, attributes, and hit points systems were retained. Most of the core classes and races are similar to those found in Dungeons & Dragons, though with some modifications, and some new classes were added while others were dropped. The highly intricate system of skills and feats found in Dungeons & Dragons 3rd edition was discarded, replaced by what the designers call the "Siege Engine", intended as an extremely easy game mechanic with universal applications. The game is compliant with the terms of the Open Game License.  The game was later nominated for a 2005 ENnie Award for Best d20 Game.

The Siege Engine works on an attribute check system. A character's attributes are divided into primary and secondary attributes. Checks made against primary attributes have a base Challenge Base (or target number; abbreviated "CB") of 12, while secondary attributes have a CB of 18. The game's referee, the Castle Keeper, adds a challenge level (usually from 1-10, depending on task difficulty) to the CB and the resulting number, the challenge class or CC, is the final target number required to succeed at a check. The player adds the character's level, any attribute bonuses and class bonuses to the roll of a twenty-sided die. If the result after bonuses equals or exceeds the challenge class, the player succeeds. Except for combat, the Siege Engine is used for anything that requires a check in the game.

While the first two printings of the Players Handbook were virtually identical with the exception of a change in font for the headers, the third printing introduced a replacement barbarian class. The 4th printing introduced an expansion to the illusionist written by James M. Ward that allowed the illusionist to heal others. The current printing introduces a streamlined replacement to the game's encumbrance rules for faster play.

Setting
The core books of the game are generic with regard to setting. While players can set the adventure in any setting they wish, some settings have been published for the game.

Aihrde
Once named Erde, Aihrde is Troll Lord Games' home setting. Originally a setting for use with Dungeons & Dragons, a summary of the setting was originally available in the World of Aihrde Folio. Books like The Free City of Eskadia expand on the setting by covering sections in more detail. A full campaign setting, The Codex of Aihrde, was released in 2015.

Bluffside
Troll Lord Games' second setting for Castles & Crusades, Bluffside is a conversion and expansion of an earlier product released by Thunderhead Games. Bluffside is designed to be placed anywhere the player desires in their existing campaign, or it can be used as a campaign setting on its own.

Haunted Highlands
Troll Lord Games' third setting for Castles & Crusades, introduced with the "DB" series of adventures.

Inzae
Troll Lord Games' gritty, realistic setting for Castles & Crusades, introduced with the "I" series of adventures.

References

External links 
 Troll Lord Games – the publisher of Castles & Crusades

Role-playing game systems
Fantasy role-playing games
Dungeons & Dragons retro-clones
Role-playing games introduced in 2004